Piirissaar (earlier Borka,  or Желачек, romanized: Zhelachek) is an Estonian island located in Lake Peipus. It belongs to Tartu County as the Tartu Parish.

Piirissaar is the largest island in Lake Peipus with a size of 7.8 km2. It is located c. 15 km from the mouth of the Emajõgi river. Piirissaar is located c. 1 – 2 meters above the water level in Lake Peipus.

The island was first permanently settled during the Great Northern War by a group of Orthodox Old Believers seeking to escape the religious reforms of Moscow Patriarch Nikon and trying to avoid enrollment in the military. Most of the island's inhabitants still belong to this confession. The inhabitants of Piirissaar are diligent gardeners and vegetable growers, especially onion growers.

Until the collapse of the Russian Empire the island was split between Livland and St.Petersburg governorates. Its Estonian (Piirissaar means Border Island) and Russian (Mezha means Border) names derive from the borderland status of the island. Since 1920 the whole island was left with Estonia and during the Soviet and later period it was never changed.

The German Luftwaffe inflicted major damage on the island in February 1944.

There are three villages on the island, Piiri, Saare and Tooni. The number of inhabitants has dropped from c. 700 in 1920 to 86 by 2006. The remaining inhabitants are mostly occupied by fishing and cultivation of onions.

Piirissaar has been a nature preserve as part of the Natura 2000 programme since 1991.

See also 
 List of islands of Estonia

External links 
 Island website 
 Pilt Eesti Maa-ameti kaardiserverist - остров на электронной карте Эстонского Земельного департамента 
 360-Degree Airiel Panorama of Piirissaar from Helicopter

References

Piirissaar
Landforms of Tartu County
Ramsar sites in Estonia
Lake islands of Estonia
Tourist attractions in Tartu County